Celebration Rock is the second studio album by Canadian rock duo Japandroids, released on June 5, 2012, by Polyvinyl. Recorded in Vancouver with Post-Nothing engineer Jesse Gander, the band aspired to capture the spirit and energy of their live shows, thus forgoing standard studio techniques such as double tracking and overdubbing, while consciously taking into account the perceived reaction of their audience to hearing the songs live in concert.

The album was released to widespread acclaim from critics, who praised its blending of classic rock and punk rock influences. The Globe and Mail named it the best Canadian album of 2012, while CBC declared it the best rock album of the year, later ranking it #91 on its list of The 100 Greatest Canadian Albums Ever. The album was also well received internationally, with Rolling Stone calling it one of The 10 Coolest Summer Albums of All Time, and Spin naming the duo Band of the Year. Pitchfork later recognized Celebration Rock as one of best albums of the 2010s, describing it as "the most beautiful, life-affirming rock record of the decade".

Background
Japandroids toured extensively in support of their first album, performing over 200 shows in more than 20 countries between June 2009 and October 2010. Following two New Year's shows December 31 and January 1 at Schubas Tavern in Chicago, the band decided to discontinue touring in support of Post-Nothing, and return to Vancouver to begin work on a new album.

After taking the bulk of 2011 off to work on new material, Japandroids revealed that they would tour North America with Bass Drum of Death throughout August and September playing primarily smaller, intimate venues in order to test out their new material prior to the recording of their second album. During these shows, the band debuted several new songs including "Fire's Highway,"", "Adrenaline Nightshift", and "Evil's Sway".

Following the tour, the band temporarily relocated from Vancouver to Nashville to continue writing. The duo cited disillusion with Vancouver, as well as the difficulty of returning to a sedentary lifestyle following two years of continuous touring, as the primary motivations for the move. Both "The House That Heaven Built" and "Continuous Thunder" were written during this period.

Recording
The album was recorded in Vancouver with Post-Nothing engineer Jesse Gander. The band has said they intended for the album to capture the spirit and energy of their live shows, thus foregoing standard studio techniques such as double tracking and overdubbing, while consciously taking into account the perceived reaction of their audience to hearing the songs live in concert. On recording the album, guitarist Brian King said "Technically speaking, the process for recording Celebration Rock was almost identical to that of our previous records: same studio, same engineer, same equipment, same techniques, etc. To me, the progression lies in the songwriting, the captured performances, and the mixing/production of the album, all of which are simply reflections of our shared knowledge and experience since recording Post-Nothing."

In an interview with Pitchfork, drummer Dave Prowse cited Appetite for Destruction as a specific influence on the album's sequencing. Rather than having a traditional ‘Side A’ and ‘Side B’ structure, Appetite For Destruction is split into ‘G’ and ‘R’ sides: the former 'Gun' side dealing with violence and debauchery (‘Welcome To The Jungle’, ‘Paradise City’), while the latter 'Roses' side focused on love and sex (‘Sweet Child o' Mine’, ‘Rocket Queen’). As King further explained, "We had this idea of the album having two sides, where [like Appetite For Destruction] ‘Side A’ is super-intense and ‘Side B’ is softer and poppier."

Music
The music on Celebration Rock has been described as "one part classic rock, one part punk", due to the blending of classic rock influences such as Bruce Springsteen and Tom Petty, with punk rock influences such as The Replacements and Hüsker Dü. Critic Steven Hyden described Celebration Rock as "taking a mighty lunge at the pantheon of great rock records," commenting that the album "addresses the teenage wasteland with the bombastic mix of fury and empathy that derives from Who's Next; traffics in the same streetwise rock-patter drivel originating from Born to Run; has the drunkard's sentimentality of Let It Be, and the tour-weary determinism of Appetite for Destruction. It's a beefy, pop-conscious punk record in the mold of Nevermind, and it's destined to become, like White Blood Cells, an important battle in the never-ending war to end bass playing as we know it."

The band has repeatedly cited Live at Raji's by The Dream Syndicate as a major influence, stating that it was the record they had listened to the most during the writing and recording of Celebration Rock. The song "The Nights of Wine and Roses" is an homage to The Dream Syndicate song "The Days of Wine and Roses".

Lyrics
Lyrically, Celebration Rock has been described as a callback to classic rock conventions for its use of universal, mythic rock & roll language, including the use of contrasting themes such as good and evil, heaven and hell, life and death, young and old, etc. As Ian Cohen of Pitchfork noted, "Japandroids have gone from having almost none at all [lyrics] to packing their songs with an astonishing command of legend and literalism that all but dares you to feel something." Regarding his use of language and themes, King stated:

King has cited the novel Under The Volcano by Malcolm Lowry as a primary influence, inspiring him to try using more descriptive and poetic language in his lyrics: "In retrospect, the only work I can see reflected in the lyrics of Celebration Rock is Under The Volcano by Malcolm Lowry, a book I read twice during 2010-2011."

Release and promotion

On March 26, 2012, Japandroids announced that their second album Celebration Rock would be released by Polyvinyl on June 5, 2012, preceded by a limited edition 7" of the album's first single "The House That Heaven Built" on May 15, 2012. On May 27, 2012, Celebration Rock was streamed in its entirety on NPR Music. The album was released in the band's native Canada on May 29, 2012. On June 8, 2012, the band performed the songs "Fire's Highway" and "The House That Heaven Built" on Late Night with Jimmy Fallon. On February 25, 2013, the band performed the song "The Nights of Wine & Roses" on Conan. On February 27, 2013, it was announced that "The House That Heaven Built" had temporarily been named the entrance theme for the Vancouver Canucks professional ice hockey team. On June 20, 2013, the band performed the song "Adrenaline Nightshift" on Late Show with David Letterman.

Music video
A video for "The House That Heaven Built", Japandroids' first music video, was released in August to promote the single. The black-and-white video, directed by Jim Larson and produced by Pitchfork.tv, documented one week in the life of Japandroids on tour using footage from the east coast portion of their spring 2012 U.S. tour, including live footage from shows in Toronto, Montreal, Boston, New York City, Brooklyn, and Washington, D.C.

Tour
Japandroids toured heavily in support of Celebration Rock, performing over 200 shows in more than 40 countries between March 2012 and November 2013. The Celebration Rock Tour consisted of 13 individual legs across North and South America, Europe, Asia, and Oceania, including numerous festival appearances: Coachella, Bonnaroo, Sasquatch!, Pitchfork, Firefly, Governors Ball, Fun Fun Fun Fest, Free Press Summer Fest, and Metallica's festival Orion in the United States, Primavera Sound, Optimus Alive!, Paredes de Coura, Pitchfork (Paris), OFF, Latitude and Longitude festivals in Europe, Vive Latino in Mexico, Fuji Rock Festival in Japan, and Laneway Festival in Australia.

Reception

Celebration Rock was released to critical acclaim. On Metacritic, the album has a score of 83 out of 100, based on 33 collected reviews. The A.V. Clubs Kyle Ryan wrote, "Maybe it's because the songs were so hard won after that long dry spell that they sound especially lively, but Celebration Rock starts strong and stays there over the course of its eight songs and 35 minutes." Ian Cohen of Pitchfork gave the album a "Best New Music" designation, writing that even though Celebration Rock was recorded the same exact way as Post-Nothing, Celebration Rock "[..] dwarf[s] its impressive predecessor." Cohen continued: "[I]n writing about something other than the experience of being Japandroids, the duo taps into a power greater than itself to address impossibly vast and elemental topics-- friendship, lust, revenge, art, self-actualization-- with songs every bit as big." Megan Ritt of Consequence of Sound felt that the band had "retained the energy that pulses below the surface of the best tracks on Post-Nothing and infused it with more focus. Where Post-Nothing melts into a hazy dream, Celebration Rock does exactly what it claims to do—it burns on and on like the best sort of party."

Not all reviews were positive, however. NMEs Alex Denney gave Celebration Rock a mixed review, writing "Japandroids know how to bring the ruckus. But elsewhere the power-chord pummelage gets a bit one-note — and The Gun Club cover only reminds us that journeymen like these have no business dancing with the bones of Jeffrey Lee Pierce." Nows Carla Gillis criticized the album's repetitiveness, writing "[..] the band's refusal ever to let up on volume, bombast, group-shouted vocals, fast-strummed chords or smashing drums makes Celebration Rock an exhausting sonic assault in need of variety."

The album peaked at number 37 on the Billboard 200.

Accolades
Celebration Rock was nominated for the Juno Award for Alternative Album of the Year.

On June 14, 2012, the album was named as a long-listed nominee for the 2012 Polaris Music Prize. On July 17, Celebration Rock was named as a shortlisted nominee, making it one of ten possible candidates to win $30,000 and the recognition as the best Canadian album of the year as voted by jury of Canadian journalists and broadcasters. The album lost to Feist's 2011 album Metals.

Celebration Rock appeared on many critics year-end best-of lists:#1 – MTV's 20 Best Albums of 2012#1 – The Globe and Mail's Albums of the Year#1 – CBC Music's Top Rock Albums of 2012#1 – BuzzFeed's Top Rock Albums of 2012#2 – The A.V. Clubs Top 25 Albums of 2012#2 – USA Today's Top Albums of 2012#2 – Insound's Top 50 Albums of 2012#3 – Spins 50 Best Albums of 2012#4 – Village Voice's Top 25 Albums of 2012#4 – Exclaim!s Top 30 Albums of 2012#5 – Los Angeles Times's Best Music of 2012#5 – Consequence of Sound's Top 50 Albums of 2012#5 – PopMatters's The 75 Best Albums of 2012#6 – Chicago Tribune's Top 10 Albums of 2012#7 – Stereogum's Top 50 Albums of 2012#7 – Paste Magazine's 50 Best Albums of 2012#9 – Rolling Stones 50 Best Albums of 2012#11 – Pitchforks Top 50 Albums of 2012
NPR's 50 Favorite Albums of 2012

Metacritic lists the album as #5 on its 2012 Music Critic's List, which collects and tallies the individual year-end Top Ten lists published by major music critics and publications. In Canada, The Globe and Mail (Canada's newspaper of record) named Celebration Rock the best Canadian album of 2012, while CBC declared it the best rock album of the year, later ranking it #91 on its list of The 100 Greatest Canadian Albums Ever. The album was also well received internationally, with Rolling Stone listing it as one of The 10 Coolest Summer Albums of All Time, and Spin magazine calling it the third best album of 2012, later naming Japandroids 2012's Band of the Year.

Track listing

Singles
 "The House That Heaven Built"' (May 15, 2012)
 7" single b/w: "Jack The Ripper" (Nick Cave & The Bad Seeds cover)

Personnel
Japandroids
 Brian King – guitar, lead vocals
 David Prowse - drums, backup vocals

Technical
 Jesse Gander - Engineering, Mixing, Production
 Alan Douches - Mastering

Photography
Reiner Asscheman 
Brian Banks 
Annika Berglund 
Christian Bobak 
Simone Cecchetti 
Andy Collins 
Sam Cowling 
Geoff Hargadon 
Andy Mueller 
Tom Øverlie 
Leonardo Solis Varela 
Maryanne Ventrice 
Charlotte Zoller

Charts

References

2012 albums
Japandroids albums
Polyvinyl Record Co. albums